The Melligan Store, also known as Agriculture Hall, is a commercial building located at 4432 Main Street in Port Hope, Michigan. It was listed on the National Register of Historic Places in 1988.

History
The building, constructed in 1884, is probably the oldest commercial structure in Port Hope. A second section was added in 1886, and a large additional on the rear was constructed in 1903.

Description
The building is a two-story, clapboarded Italianate commercial block with a false front.

References

National Register of Historic Places in Huron County, Michigan
Italianate architecture in Michigan